WIII may refer to:

 Soekarno–Hatta International Airport (ICAO code "WIII") in Jakarta, Indonesia
 WIII (FM) 99.9, a  radio station in Cortland, New York, United States
 WSTR-TV, whose former calls were WIII, in Cincinnati, Ohio, United States

See also 
 WII (disambiguation)
 World War III (WWIII)